Ahn Hyo-jin (born December 10, 1991), professionally known as ELLY and formerly known as LE, is a South Korean rapper, producer and songwriter. She has been a member of K-pop girl group EXID since 2012. She was also previously a member of the underground hip hop group, Jiggy Fellaz, performing under the stage name, Elly. 

Elly left Banana Culture on March 25, 2020.

Career

EXID

EXID officially debuted on February 16, 2012, with the release of their debut single, "Whoz That Girl".

Solo activities
In May 2012, Elly collaborated with Gavy NJ on their song, "Don't Call Me".

In February 2013, producer Brave Brothers revealed that Elly had collaborated with B2ST's Junhyung and Big Star's Feeldog in a project group and would be releasing a single on February 21, 2013. A teaser was released on February with a "19+" rating, which was previously acknowledged in the single cover, "19+ Profanity Included – Absurd", and on February 20, Brave Brothers released Elly's version of the "You Got Some Nerve" MV teaser. A "15+" version of the song was released on February 21, with the curse words in the song bleeped out. The original song was rated "19+", but representatives of Brave Brothers said "You Got Some Nerve" was scheduled to be released as is with a 19+ rating, but due to the interest and requests of the fans, they decided to beep out the profanity. The explicit version of the song and its music video was released on February 25, 2013. Some fans were angered by this, wondering "why attention was attracted by writing a 19+ rating on the poster," while a media outlet revealed that the song had never been sent to the TV networks to be reviewed and disappointment was expressed on Brave Brothers' attitude toward the situation due to "media play" and mocking fans.

In July 2014, Elly was featured in Hyuna's mini-album, A Talk, and helped write the lyrics for the songs "French Kiss" and "Blacklist" and was featured on the latter.

Elly helped co-produce the debut single album of girl group Tri.be alongside EXID producer and longtime collaborator Shinsadong Tiger.

On February 2, 2021, Elly announced on her Twitter account that she has changed her professional name back to "Elly" after fans noticed that her writing credits on Tri.be's album, Tri.be Da Loca, featured her updated name. EXID's most recent single album, X, released in September 2022 for their 10th anniversary, also featured this updated name in promotions.

Discography

Singles

Other charted songs

Songwriting credits 

Source: Korea Music Copyright Association.

Filmography

Variety shows

References

External links
 

South Korean female idols
South Korean women pop singers
South Korean women rappers
South Korean singer-songwriters
South Korean record producers
1991 births
Living people
EXID members
Mandarin-language singers of South Korea
Show Me the Money (South Korean TV series) contestants
21st-century South Korean women singers
21st-century South Korean singers
South Korean women record producers
South Korean women singer-songwriters
South Korean hip hop record producers